The 1901 New South Wales state election was for 125 electoral districts, with each district returning one member.
The election was conducted on the basis of a simple majority or first-past-the-post voting system. In this election, in 32 electorates the winning candidate received less than 50% of the votes, while 13 were uncontested. The average number of enrolled voters per electorate was 2,764, ranging from Wentworth (1,706) to Willoughby (4,854).

Of the 125 members of the house prior to the election, 18 had been elected to the new federal parliament, while 7 did not contest the election, and a further 17 were defeated at the election. 81 members (65%) retained a seat after the election.

Election results

Albury

Alma

The sitting member was Josiah Thomas (Labour) who did not contest the election as he had been elected in March 1901 to the federal seat of Barrier which included Broken Hill. William Williams nominated as an Independent Labor candidate after friction between local branches and the Barrier District Assembly.

Annandale

Argyle

Armidale

Ashburnham

Ashfield

Bernhard Wise (Protectionist) had won the seat at the 1898 election, however he was appointed to the Legislative Council and Frederick Winchcombe (Liberal Reform) won the seat at the November 1900 by-election.

Ballina

Balmain North

The sitting member was Bill Wilks (Liberal Reform) who did not contest the election as he had been elected in March 1901 to the federal seat of Dalley which included Balmain.

Balmain South

The Barwon

Bathurst

Bega

Bingara

Boorowa

Kenneth Mackay (Progressive) had been elected in 1898, however, he was appointed to the Legislative Council and Niels Nielsen (Labour) won the seat at the by-election.

Botany

Bourke

Bowral

Braidwood

Broken Hill

Burwood

Camden

Canterbury

Varney Parkes (Free Trade) had won the seat at the 1898 election, however he resigned and Thomas Taylor (Independent) won the seat at the July 1900 by-election.

The Clarence

Cobar

Condoublin

The election was overturned by the Elections and Qualifications Committee due to irregularities in the poll and Patrick Clara retained the seat for Labour at the subsequent by-election.

Coonamble

Cowra

Darlington

Deniliquin

The sitting member was John Chanter (Progressive) who did not contest the election as he had been elected in March 1901 to the federal seat of Riverina which included Deniliquin.

Dubbo

Durham

East Maitland

Eden-Bombala

Glebe

Glen Innes

Gloucester

Goulburn

Grafton

Granville

Grenfell

Gundagai

Gunnedah

The sitting member Thomas Goodwin (Progressive) did not contest the election.

Hartley

The sitting member was Joseph Cook (Liberal Reform) who did not contest the election as he had been elected in March 1901 to the federal seat of Parramatta.

The Hastings and The Macleay

The sitting member was Francis Clarke (Progressive) who did not contest the election as he had been elected in March 1901 to the federal seat of Cowper.

The Hawkesbury

Hay

The Hume

Sir William Lyne (Progressive) resigned prior to the federal election in March 1901 at which he successfully contested the seat of Hume. Having resigned earlier than other candidates, a by-election was held in April 1901 in which Gordon McLaurin retained the seat for the Progressive Party.

Illawarra

Inverell

The sitting member was George Cruickshank (Progressive) who did not contest the election as he had been elected in March 1901 to the federal seat of Gwydir.

Kahibah

Kiama

The Lachlan

Leichhardt

Lismore

The sitting member was Thomas Ewing (Progressive) who did not contest the election as he had been elected in March 1901 to the federal seat of Richmond.

Macquarie

The Manning

Marrickville

The sitting member was Francis McLean (Liberal Reform) who did not contest the election as he had been elected in March 1901 to the federal seat of Lang which included Marrickville.

Molong

Manaro

Moree

The sitting member was Thomas Hassall (Progressive) who did not contest the election.

Moruya

Mudgee

The Murray

The Murrumbidgee

Narrabri

The sitting member was Hugh Ross (Labour) who unsuccessfully contested Quirindi.

The Nepean

Newcastle East

Newcastle West

The sitting member was James Thomson (Labour) who did not contest the election.

Newtown-Camperdown

The sitting member was Francis Cotton (Liberal Reform) who did not contest the election.

Newtown-Erskine

Newtown-St Peters

Northumberland

Richard Stevenson (Protectionist) died in 1899 and John Norton (Independent) won the seat in a by-election.

Orange

Paddington

The sitting member was John Neild (Liberal Reform) who did not contest the election as he had been elected in March 1901 as a Senator for NSW.

Parramatta

Petersham

Queanbeyan

Quirindi

Raleigh

The sitting member John McLaughlin (Independent) did not contest the election.

Randwick

Redfern

The Richmond

Robertson

Ryde

Rylstone

St George

St Leonards

Sherbrooke

The Shoalhaven

Singleton

Sturt

William Ferguson had been elected in 1898 as a Labour representative, however he was denied endorsement due to his independent behaviour in the Assembly.

Sydney-Belmore

Sydney-Bligh

Sydney-Cook

Sydney-Denison

The sitting member  Sir Matthew Harris (Liberal Reform) did not contest the election.

Sydney-Fitzroy

At the 1898 election Henry Chapman was elected as a Liberal Reform representative, while Daniel Levy had stood as an independent.

Sydney-Flinders

Sydney-Gipps

Sydney-King

The sitting member was George Reid (Liberal Reform) who did not contest the election as he had been elected in March 1901 to the federal seat of East Sydney.

Sydney-Lang

The sitting member was Billy Hughes (Labour) who did not contest the election as he had been elected in March 1901 to the federal seat of West Sydney.

Sydney-Phillip

Sydney-Pyrmont

Tamworth

The sitting member was William Sawers (Progressive) who did not contest the election as he had been elected in March 1901 to the federal seat of New England.

Tenterfield

Tumut

The Tweed

Uralla-Walcha

Wagga Wagga

Wallsend

Waratah

Warringah

The sitting member was Dugald Thomson (Progressive), who did not contest the election as he had been elected in March 1901 as a Free Trade member for the federal seat of North Sydney.

Waterloo

Waverley

Wellington

Wentworth

The sitting member was Sir Joseph Abbott who did not contest the election.

West Macquarie

West Maitland

Wickham

Wilcannia

Willoughby

Woollahra

Woronora

Yass

Young

The sitting member was Chris Watson (Labour) who did not contest the election as he had been elected in March 1901 to the federal seat of Bland.

See also 

 Candidates of the 1901 New South Wales state election
 Members of the New South Wales Legislative Assembly, 1901–1904

Notes

References 

1901